The Billboard 200 is a record chart ranking the 200 most popular music albums and EPs in the United States. It is published weekly by Billboard magazine and is frequently used to convey the popularity of an artist or groups of artists. Often, a recording act will be remembered by its "number ones", those of their albums that outperformed all others during at least one week. The chart grew from a weekly top 10 list in 1956 to become a top 200 list in May 1967, and acquired its current name in March 1992. Its previous names include the Billboard Top LPs (1961–1972), Billboard Top LPs & Tape (1972–1984), Billboard Top 200 Albums (1984–1985) and Billboard Top Pop Albums (1985–1992).

The chart is based mostly on sales – both at retail and digital – of albums in the United States. The weekly sales period was originally Monday to Sunday when Nielsen started tracking sales in 1991, but since July 2015, the tracking week begins on Friday (to coincide with the Global Release Day of the music industry) and ends on Thursday. A new chart is published the following Tuesday with an issue post dated to the Saturday of that week, four days later. The chart's streaming schedule is also tracked from Friday to Thursday. New product is released to the American market on Fridays. Digital downloads of albums are also included in Billboard 200 tabulation. Albums that are not licensed for retail sale in the United States (yet purchased in the U.S. as imports) are not eligible to chart. A long-standing policy, which made titles that are sold exclusively by specific retail outlets (such as Walmart and Starbucks) ineligible for charting, was reversed on November 7, 2007, and took effect in the issue dated November 17.

Beginning with the December 13, 2014, issue, Billboard updated the methodology of its album chart to also include on-demand streaming and digital track sales (as measured by Nielsen SoundScan) by way of a new algorithm, utilizing data from all of the major on-demand audio subscription and online music sales services in the U.S. Starting on the issue dated January 18, 2020, Billboard updated the methodology to compile the chart again by incorporating video data from YouTube, along with visual plays from digital platforms like Apple Music, Spotify, Tidal, Vevo and, as of the issue dated March 23, 2021, Facebook.

As of the issue dated , the current no. 1 album on the Billboard 200 is One Thing at a Time by Morgan Wallen.

History
Billboard began an album chart in 1945. Initially only five positions long, the album chart was not published on a weekly basis, with weeks sometimes passing before it was updated. A biweekly (though with a few gaps), 15-position "Best-Selling Popular Albums" chart appeared in 1955. With the increase in album sales as the early 1950s format wars stabilized into market dominance by 45 RPM singles and long-playing 12-inch albums – and with 78 RPM record and long-playing 10-inch album sales decreasing dramatically – Billboard premiered a weekly "Best-Selling Popular Albums" chart on March 24, 1956. The position count varied anywhere from 10 to 30 albums. The first No. 1 album on the new weekly list was Belafonte by Harry Belafonte. The chart was renamed "Best-Selling Pop Albums" later in 1956, and then "Best-Selling Pop LPs" in 1957.

Beginning on May 25, 1959, Billboard split the ranking into two charts: "Best-Selling Stereophonic LPs" for stereo albums (30 positions) and "Best-Selling Monophonic LPs" for mono albums (50 positions). These were renamed "Stereo Action Charts" (30 positions) and "Mono Action Charts" (40 positions), respectively, in 1960. In January 1961, they became "Action Albums – Stereophonic" (15 positions) and "Action Albums – Monophonic" (25 positions), and three months later, they became "Top LPs – Stereo" (50 positions) and "Top LPs – Monaural" (150 positions).

On August 17, 1963, the stereo and mono charts were combined into a 150-position chart called "Top LPs". On April 1, 1967, the chart was expanded to 175 positions, and then finally to 200 positions on May 13, 1967. In February 1972, the album chart's title was changed to "Top LPs & Tape"; in 1984, it was retitled "Top 200 Albums"; in 1985, it was retitled again to "Top Pop Albums"; in 1991, it became the "Billboard 200 Top Albums"; and it was given its current title of the "Billboard 200" on March 14, 1992.

From the end of 1970 to 1985, Billboard also printed a "Bubbling Under the Top LPs" albums chart paired with the "Bubbling Under the Hot 100" singles chart, which listed albums that had not yet charted on what was then the "Top LPs & Tape" chart.

Catalog albums
In 1960, Billboard began concurrently publishing album charts that ranked sales of older or mid-priced titles. These "Essential Inventory" charts were divided by stereo and mono albums, and featured titles that had already appeared on the main stereo and mono album charts. Mono albums were moved to the "Essential Inventory – Mono" chart (25 positions) after spending 40 weeks on the "Mono Action Chart", and stereo albums were moved to the "Essential Inventory – Stereo" chart (20 positions) after 20 weeks on the "Stereo Action Chart".

In January 1961, the "Action Charts" became "Action Albums – Stereophonic" (15 positions) and "Action Albums – Monophonic" (24 positions). Albums appeared on either chart for up to nine weeks, and were then moved to an "Essential Inventory" list of approximately 200 titles and with no numerical ranking. This list continued to be published until the consolidated "Top LPs" chart debuted in 1963.

In 1982, Billboard began publishing a "Midline Albums" chart (alternatively titled "Midline LPs"), which ranked older or mid-priced titles. The chart held 50 positions and was published on a biweekly (and later triweekly) basis.

On May 25, 1991, Billboard premiered the "Top Pop Catalog Albums" chart, the criteria for which were albums that were more than 18 months old and had fallen below No. 100 on the Billboard 200. An album did not have to chart on the Billboard 200 to qualify for this chart. 

"Both Dark Side of the Moon and The Wall should be in the Billboard Top 200," observed former Pink Floyd member Roger Waters in 1992. "The Wall still does anything up to four million each year… They've created a catalog chart in which to place all these old albums, leaving the main chart free for all the artists the record companies will want to book advertising space for. It just offers further evidence of the dishonesty that's rife in this business."

Starting with the issue dated December 5, 2009, however, the catalog limitations – which removed albums over 18 months old, albums that have dropped below No. 100 and albums that had no currently running singles – for the Billboard 200 were lifted, turning the chart into an all-inclusive list of the 200 highest-selling albums in the country (essentially changing "Top Comprehensive Albums" into the Billboard 200). A new chart that keeps the previous criteria for the Billboard 200 – dubbed the "Top Current Albums" chart – was also introduced in the same issue.

Holiday albums
Billboard has adjusted its policies for Christmas and holiday albums several times. The albums were eligible for the main album charts until 1963, when a "Christmas Albums" chart was created. Albums appearing here were not listed on the "Top LPs" chart, and in 1974, this rule was reverted and holiday albums again appeared within the main list.

In 1983, the "Christmas Albums" chart was resurrected, but a title's appearance here did not disqualify it from appearing on the "Top Pop Albums" chart. In 1994, the chart was retitled "Top Holiday Albums"; as of 2009, it holds 50 positions and runs for several weeks during the end-of-calendar-year holiday season. Its current policy allows holiday albums to concurrently chart on the "Top Holiday Albums" list and the Billboard 200.

Nielsen SoundScan
Since May 25, 1991, the Billboard 200's positions have been derived from Nielsen SoundScan sales data; as of 2008, it is contributed to by approximately 14,000 music sellers. Because these numbers are supplied by a subset of sellers rather than record labels, it is common for these numbers to be substantially lower than those reported by the Recording Industry Association of America when Gold, Platinum and Diamond album awards are announced. (RIAA awards reflect wholesale shipments, not retail sales.)

Incorporation of streaming data and track sales

Beginning with the December 13, 2014, issue, Billboard updated the methodology of its album chart again, changing from a "pure sales-based ranking" to one measuring "multi-metric consumption". With this overhaul, the Billboard 200 includes on-demand streaming and digital track sales (as measured by Nielsen SoundScan) by way of a new algorithm, utilizing data from all of the major on-demand audio subscription services, including Spotify, Beats Music, Google Play and Xbox Music. Under the new methodology, 10 track sales or 1,500 song streams from an album are treated as equivalent to one purchase of the album. Billboard continues to publish a pure album sales chart, called "Top Album Sales," that maintains the traditional Billboard 200 methodology but is based exclusively on SoundScan's sales data.

Beginning on January 18, 2020, Billboard incorporated video and audio data from YouTube, along with visual plays from streaming services like Apple Music, Spotify, Tidal and Vevo, into the Billboard 200. The change has also impacted Billboard genre-specific album charts.

Year-end charts
Billboard "chart year" runs from the first week of December to the final week in November. This altered calendar allows for Billboard to calculate year-end charts and release them in time for its final print issue in the last week of December. Prior to Nielsen SoundScan, year-end charts were calculated by an inverse-point system based solely on an album's performance on the Billboard 200 (e.g., an album would be given one point for a week spent at No. 200, two points for a week spent at No. 199, etc., up to 200 points for each week spent at No. 1). Other factors, including an album's total weeks spent on the chart and its peak position, are calculated into an album's year-end total.

Since Billboard began obtaining sales information from Nielsen SoundScan, the year-end charts are now calculated by a very straightforward cumulative total of yearlong sales. This gives a more accurate picture of any given year's best-selling albums, as a title that hypothetically spent nine weeks at No. 1 in March could possibly have sold fewer copies than one spending six weeks at No. 3 in January. Albums at the peak of their popularity at the time of the November/December chart-year cutoff many times end up ranked lower than one would expect on a year-end tally, yet are ranked on the following year's chart as well, as their cumulative points are split between the two chart-years.

All-Time Billboard 200 achievements (1963–2015)
In 2015, Billboard compiled a ranking of the 100 best-performing albums on the Billboard 200 over its 52 years, along with the best-performing artists. Shown below are the top 10 albums and top 10 artists over the 52-year period of the Billboard 200, through October 2015. Also shown are the artists placing the most albums on the overall "all-time" top 100 album list.

Top 10 albums of All Time (1963–2015)

Source:

Top 10 albums artists of All Time (1963–2015)

Source:

Artists with the most albums on Billboards Top 200 Albums of All Time (1963–2015)

Source:

Artist milestones

Most No. 1 albums

 As a musician, Paul McCartney has the most No. 1 albums, with 27. This includes 19 albums from his work with The Beatles, three solo albums and five albums as a part of his 1970s group Wings. John Lennon is in second place with 22, including 19 albums with The Beatles, two solo albums, and one album credited to him and his wife Yoko Ono. George Harrison had 19 No. 1 albums with The Beatles and two as a solo artist.
 Barbra Streisand is the only artist to have No. 1 albums in six different decades. Her first was the 1964 album People, and her most recent was the 2016 album Encore: Movie Partners Sing Broadway, with a few weeks shy of 52 years between the two hitting No. 1.

Most No. 1 albums in a calendar year

Most consecutive No. 1 studio albums

Most consecutive studio albums to debut at No. 1

 On May 1, 2016, Beyoncé became the only artist to have their first six studio albums debut at No. 1 on the Billboard 200 chart, following the release of her sixth studio album, Lemonade, surpassing DMX. Following the release of Renaissance and its debut atop the August 7, 2022, chart, she extended that record, becoming the only artist to debut their first seven albums atop the chart.
 On April 3, 2021, Justin Bieber became the first male act to have his first six studio albums debut at No. 1 on the Billboard 200 chart, following the release of his sixth studio album, Justice.

Most cumulative weeks at No. 1
List of acts with the most weeks at No. 1 on the Billboard 200 since August 17, 1963.

Sources:
 The Beatles (132)
 Elvis Presley (67)
 Taylor Swift (60)
 Garth Brooks (52)
 Michael Jackson (51)
 The Kingston Trio (46) 
 Whitney Houston (46) 
 Adele (40)
 Elton John (39)
 Fleetwood Mac (38) 
 The Rolling Stones (38) 
 Harry Belafonte (37) 
 The Monkees (37)

Most top-10 albums
The following artists are the only ones with 30 or more top-10 albums:
 The Rolling Stones (37)
 Barbra Streisand (34)
 Frank Sinatra (32)  
 The Beatles (32) 

Note: As a musician, Paul McCartney has the most top-10 albums, with 51. This includes 32 with The Beatles, 11 solo albums, seven albums with the group Wings, and one album credited to him and his first wife, Linda McCartney.

Most albums in the top 10 simultaneously
 Prince (5) – 2016
 The Kingston Trio (4 for 5 consecutive weeks) – 1959
 Herb Alpert & the Tijuana Brass (4) – 1966
 Peter, Paul and Mary (3) – 1963
 Whitney Houston (3) – 2012
 Led Zeppelin (3) – 2014

Most albums in the top 200 simultaneously

 Prince (19) – 2016
 The Beatles (13) – 2014
 Taylor Swift (10) - 2023
 Whitney Houston (10) – 2012
 David Bowie (10) – 2016
 Led Zeppelin (9) – 1979
 Taylor Swift (9 - 13 times between 2021 and 2023) – 2021, 2022, 2023
 Eminem (8) – 2013 
 Linkin Park (8) – 2017
 Chicago (7) – 1974
 Elvis Presley (7) – 1977
 The Monkees (7) – 1986
 Pearl Jam (7) – 2001
 Mac Miller (7) – 2018
 Drake (7) – 2022

Album milestones

Most weeks at No. 1

† The West Side Story soundtrack ran for 53 weeks at No. 1 on the stereo album chart; it was No. 1 for 12 weeks on the mono album chart.

‡ The South Pacific soundtrack ran for 28 weeks at No. 1 on the stereo album chart; it was No. 1 for three weeks on the mono album chart.

§ This is the Blue Hawaii album's run on the mono album chart; it was No. 1 for four weeks on the stereo album chart.
 Tapestry by Carole King holds the record for most consecutive weeks at No. 1 on the Billboard 200 for any one album by a female solo artist with 15 weeks.

Most weeks on the chart

Note that totals are for the main albums chart only, catalog chart totals are not factored in.
(*) indicates that the album is currently charting.

† Pre-Billboard 200 and Billboard 200

Largest jumps to No. 1
 (176 to 1) Life After Death – The Notorious B.I.G. 
 (173 to 1) Vitalogy – Pearl Jam 
 (157 to 1) Fearless (Taylor's Version) – Taylor Swift 
 (156 to 1) In Rainbows – Radiohead 
 (137 to 1) Ghetto D – Master P 
 (122 to 1) More of The Monkees – The Monkees 
 (120 to 1) Call Me If You Get Lost – Tyler, the Creator 
 (112 to 1) MP da Last Don – Master P 
 (98 to 1) Beatles '65 – The Beatles 
 (74 to 1) Evermore – Taylor Swift

Largest drops from No. 1
 (1 to 169) This House Is Not for Sale – Bon Jovi 
 (1 to 139) Call Me If You Get Lost – Tyler, the Creator 
 (1 to 111) Courage – Celine Dion 
 (1 to 97) Science Fiction – Brand New 
 (1 to 88) Iridescence – Brockhampton 
 (1 to 77) Madame X – Madonna  
 (1 to 62) Boarding House Reach – Jack White 
 (1 to 59) Wonderful Wonderful – The Killers 
 (1 to 56) American Dream – LCD Soundsystem 
 (1 to 45) Help Us Stranger – The Raconteurs 

Notes:
 The album Music to Be Murdered By by Eminem has the largest rise for an album that did not top the chart; on January 2, 2021, it jumped from No. 199 the previous week to No. 3 on the chart.
 The album Hello from Las Vegas by Lionel Richie has the largest drop for an album that did not top the chart; on September 7, 2019, it disappeared from the chart after having debuted the previous week at No. 2.

Longest climbs to No. 1 in the SoundScan era
Here are the albums to complete the 10 longest rises to No. 1 on the Billboard 200 since the adoption of Nielsen Music data in 1991.

 Forever Your Girl by Paula Abdul spent 64 consecutive weeks on the Billboard 200 before hitting No. 1 in 1989, making it the longest time spent on the chart before reaching the No. 1 spot.

Albums to top the Billboard 200 by artists who have never appeared on the Hot 100

Note: Newhart, Meader and Fontaine's albums were all No. 1 on the mono chart but not on the stereo chart. Garland is listed on a technicality; she has 17 pop hits, but all were from 1939 to 1955 – all before the 1958 establishment of the Hot 100.

Additional milestones
 The first album to debut at No. 1 was Captain Fantastic and the Brown Dirt Cowboy by Elton John. John repeated the same feat with the album Rock of the Westies – the second album to debut at No. 1 – making John the first artist to have two consecutive studio albums debut at No. 1. Whitney Houston's second album, Whitney, was the first album by a female artist to debut at No. 1.
 In the early 1960s, Bob Newhart accomplished the feat of having the No. 1 and No. 2 albums simultaneously on the Billboard albums chart, with The Button-Down Mind of Bob Newhart and The Button-Down Mind Strikes Back! This was equaled by The Beatles multiple times: twice in 1964 with Meet The Beatles! and Introducing... The Beatles, and then with A Hard Day's Night and Something New, followed in 1969 by the album The Beatles (commonly known as The White Album) and the soundtrack for the film Yellow Submarine. In 1991, Guns N' Roses held the top two with Use Your Illusion I and Use Your Illusion II; in 2004, Nelly's Suit and Sweat; and in 2017, Future's Future and Hndrxx.
 The Sound of Music set the record of 109 non-consecutive weeks in the top 10 from May 1, 1965, to July 16, 1966, but only spent two weeks at No. 1 on the Billboard 200.
 The only EPs to reach No. 1 on the chart are Alice in Chains's Jar of Flies in 1994; Linkin Park and Jay-Z's collaboration EP, Collision Course, in 2004; the cast of the television series Glee with Glee: The Music, The Power of Madonna and Glee: The Music, Journey to Regionals in 2010; Bad Meets Evil's Hell: The Sequel in 2011; The Weeknd's My Dear Melancholy in 2018; BTS's Map of the Soul: Persona; SuperM's SuperM – The 1st Mini Album in 2019;, Stray Kids' Oddinary and Maxident in 2022,  and Tomorrow X Together's The Name Chapter: Temptation in 2023.
 The first U.K. solo artist to debut at No. 1 with a debut album is Leona Lewis on April 26, 2008, with the album Spirit. The first U.K. group to debut at No. 1 with a debut album is One Direction on March 31, 2012, with the album Up All Night.
 Justin Bieber became the first artist in history to have five albums top the Billboard 200 at the age of 18, as Believe Acoustic debuted at No. 1 on February 16, 2013. He also became the youngest solo artist to achieve this feat. Subsequently, Bieber became the youngest solo artist to achieve seven No. 1 albums on the chart with Changes, breaking a 59-year-old record set by Elvis Presley at the age of 26. He further extended his record, after turning 27, by becoming the youngest soloist to have eight albums top the Billboard 200, following the release of his sixth studio album, Justice, breaking yet another chart record held by Elvis Presley at the age of 29.
 Tony Bennett became the oldest male to debut at No. 1 on October 8, 2011 ( old), with the album Duets II. Bennett, who was born on August 3, 1926, later surpassed his own record when his collaborative album with Lady Gaga, Cheek to Cheek, debuted at No. 1 on October 11, 2014 ( old).
 The issue dated July 11, 2009, was the first time any catalog album outsold the No. 1 album on the Billboard 200. Three of Michael Jackson's albums – Number Ones, The Essential Michael Jackson and Thriller – claimed positions 1–3, respectively, on "Top Pop Catalog Albums" and "Top Comprehensive Albums" in the week following Jackson's death.
 In 2012, Adam Lambert became the first openly gay musician to debut at No. 1 with his album Trespassing.
 There have been 40 albums released on an independent label to reach No. 1 on the Billboard 200.
 Jackie Gleason, at least for a time, held the record for the most albums to top the Billboard 200 without charting any songs in the top 40 of the Hot 100; five of Gleason's mood music albums topped the Billboard 200 in the mid-1950s.
 One Direction became the first group to debut at No. 1 with its first three albums when Midnight Memories debuted at No. 1 on the Billboard 200 chart dated December 14, 2013. It later became the first group to debut at No. 1 with its first four albums when Four debuted atop the chart on November 26, 2014.
 Led Zeppelin holds the record for the longest gap between an album returning to the Top 10. Led Zeppelin first hit the Top 10 on the Billboard "Top LP's" chart for the week ending May 17, 1969, and returned 45 years and 35 days later at No. 7 on the Billboard 200, for the week ending June 21, 2014.
 On November 29, 2015, 25 by Adele registered the highest weekly sales figure for a No. 1 album in the Billboard 200 chart history, with 3.38 million units sold. It also became the first album to sell 1 million copies in different weeks, with 1.11 million sold in its second week and 1.16 million sold in its fifth week on the chart.
 On May 22, 2016, Coloring Book by Chance the Rapper became the first streaming-only album to chart on the Billboard 200, debuting at No. 8, with the album being streamed 57.3 million times in its first week, which was equivalent to 38,000 units sold.
 On March 18, 2017, Future made history by achieving back-to-back No. 1 album debuts in successive weeks with Future and Hndrxx for the first time in the chart's history.
 On June 2, 2018, BTS became the first Korean artist to reach No. 1 with its album Love Yourself: Tear.
 Taylor Swift is the first and only act in Nielsen SoundScan history to have nine albums each sell at least 500,000 copies in a week, as of October 2022. Her albums Fearless, Speak Now, Red, 1989, Reputation, Lover, Folklore, Red (Taylor's Version) and Midnights each accumulated more than 500,000 sales in their first weeks.
 On January 19, 2019, A Boogie wit da Hoodie's Hoodie SZN became the album with the lowest weekly sales figure for a No. 1 album, with 1,000 sales. It subsequently did not sell enough to enter the sales-only "Top 100 Album Sales" chart. A week later, the album broke its own record when it stayed at No. 1 for a second week, selling 749 copies.
 In 2017, Taylor Swift became the first artist to debut at the top of the chart with four albums that sold over 1 million copies within a week, accomplishing the feat with Speak Now, Red, 1989 and Reputation. In 2022, she extended the record to five with Midnights.
 On November 2, 2020, Bruce Springsteen became the first artist to have an album reach the top 5 of the Billboard 200 in six different decades (1970s–2020s).

See also
 List of Billboard 200 number-one albums
 List of highest-certified music artists in the United States

Sources
 Joel Whitburn Presents the Billboard Albums, 6th edition, 
 
 Additional information obtained can be verified within Billboard's online archive services and print editions of the magazine.

References

External links
 Current Billboard 200

Billboard charts